Diaka may refer to:
Diaka, Mali
Diaka, Burkina Faso